Harthill with Woodall is a civil parish in the Metropolitan Borough of Rotherham, South Yorkshire, England.  The parish contains eleven listed buildings that are recorded in the National Heritage List for England.  Of these, one is listed at Grade I, the highest of the three grades, one is at Grade II*, the middle grade, and the others are at Grade II, the lowest grade.  The parish contains the villages of Harthill and Woodall and the surrounding countryside.  The Chesterfield Canal passes through the periphery of the parish, and two bridges crossing it are listed.   Most of the other listed buildings are houses and farmhouses, the rest including a church, a former threshing barn, the possible base of a medieval cross, and a schoolhouse.


Key

Buildings

References

Citations

Sources

 

Lists of listed buildings in South Yorkshire
Buildings and structures in the Metropolitan Borough of Rotherham